Kostyukevich is an East Slavic language surname.

Notable people with the surname include:
 Igor Kostyukov (1961), Russian admiral
 Mikhail Kostyukov (1991), Russian football player
 Stepan Kostyukov (1999), Russian football player
 Vladimir Kostyukov (1954–2015), Belarusian professional football player and later coach

Ukrainian-language surnames
Belarusian-language surnames
Russian-language surnames